Cameron Thomas (born July 1, 2000) is an American football outside linebacker for the Arizona Cardinals of the National Football League (NFL). He played college football at San Diego State and was drafted by the Cardinals in the third round of the 2022 NFL Draft.

Early life and high school career
Thomas grew up in Carlsbad, California and attended Carlsbad High School. He committed to play college football at San Diego State over offers from Oregon State, Wyoming and Navy.

College career
Thomas redshirted his true freshman season. As a redshirt freshman, he was named first-team All-Mountain West Conference and a second-team freshman All-American by The Athletic after finishing the season with 49 tackles, nine tackles for loss, and 5.5 sacks. Thomas had four sacks and 9.5 tackles for loss  and repeated as a first-team All-Mountain West selection in SDSU's COVID-19-shortened 2020 season.

Thomas repeated as a first-team All-Mountain West selection as a redshirt junior and was named the conference Defensive Player of the Year. Thomas was also named a second-team All-American by the Associated Press, Football Writers Association of America, Walter Camp Foundation, and the Sporting News.

Professional career

Thomas was selected in the third round (87th overall) by the Arizona Cardinals in the 2022 NFL Draft.

References

External links
 Arizona Cardinals bio
 San Diego State Aztecs bio

2000 births
Living people
American football defensive ends
Arizona Cardinals players
Players of American football from California
San Diego State Aztecs football players
Sportspeople from Carlsbad, California